Heiwa Real Estate is a Japanese real estate and construction company. It is listed on the Nikkei 225.

References

Real estate companies established in 1947
Companies listed on the Tokyo Stock Exchange
Construction and civil engineering companies based in Tokyo
Real estate companies based in Tokyo
Japanese companies established in 1947
Construction and civil engineering companies established in 1947